Aleksey Anatolyevich Baga (born 4 February 1981) is a Belarusian professional football manager and former player.

Managerial career
After retirement in early 2011, Baga returned to BATE Borisov to work as an assistant manager. In June 2018 he was appointed as BATE Borisov manager, staying on that position until December 2019. He won the Belarusian Premier League with BATE in 2018.

In January 2020, Baga became the new manager of Lithuanian A Lyga club Žalgiris.

On 21 January 2021, Baga was appointed as Head Coach of Aktobe, resigning from this position on 5 May 2021.

On 30 December 2021, Baga was appointed as the new Head Coach of Sumgayit on a 2.5-year contract.

Personal life
Aleksey's younger brother Dzmitry is also a professional footballer who plays for BATE Borisov.

Honours

Player
BATE Borisov
Belarusian Premier League: 2002, 2006
Belarusian Cup: 2005–06

Manager
BATE Borisov
Belarusian Premier League: 2018

Žalgiris Vilnius
A Lyga: 2020

Shakhtyor Soligorsk
Belarusian Premier League: 2021
Belarusian Super Cup: 2021, 2023

References

External links
Profile at teams.by

1981 births
Living people
People from Barysaw
Sportspeople from Minsk Region
Belarusian footballers
Association football defenders
FC BATE Borisov players
FC Smena Minsk players
Expatriate footballers in Latvia
FC Daugava players
FC Dynamo Brest players
Belarusian expatriate sportspeople in Latvia
Belarusian football managers
Belarusian expatriate football managers
Expatriate football managers in Lithuania
Expatriate football managers in Kazakhstan
Expatriate football managers in Azerbaijan
FC BATE Borisov managers
FK Žalgiris managers
FC Aktobe managers
FC Shakhtyor Soligorsk managers
Sumgayit FK managers
Belarusian expatriate sportspeople in Azerbaijan
Belarusian expatriate sportspeople in Kazakhstan